Jean-Yves "Blacky" Thériault (born 15 December 1962) is the former bassist for Canadian thrash/progressive metal band Voivod. He co-founded the band and appeared on the first six albums – War and Pain, Rrröööaaarrr, Killing Technology, Dimension Hatross, Nothingface, and Angel Rat. He departed the group in 1991 for personal reasons, and went on to co-found The Holy Body Tattoo Dance Society from 1992 to 1999. He composed, produced and engineered the scores for "White Riot", "L'Orage", "Poetry & Apocalypse", and "Our Brief Eternity".

In 1997 he released The Electronic Voice Phenomena CD with Mark Spybey and established the X-voto Recording label.

Thériault co-produced the Negativa self-titled three-song EP with Pierre Rémillard at Wild Studio in St-Zenon, Quebec.

Thériault returned to Voivod in 2008, after releasing a statement on August 26, 2008 regarding his involvement with the band.

Thériault continues to create electroacoustic music. His collaboration Hiatus, created with Australian artist Matt Warren, was presented in conjunction with the photographic work of artists Lena Stuart and Sally Rees at the Richmond, Virginia, InLight Festival on September 5, 2008 .

Thériault composed, produced, recorded and edited Voivod's 2013 album Target Earth. On July 10, 2014, it was announced that he was forced out of the band, for months he requested meetings regarding the band business and artistic affairs, but was denied such talks by the other members.

Thériault is currently working with Monica Emond on a new artistic project called Coeur Atomique. The duo have since released two songs and video entitled, "Castle Bravo" "The Waste". Coeur Atomique first album was officially release on July 10, 2017.  A second album titled Landscape of Emergency I was released through Coup Sur Coup Records in 2021.

Camera Obscura: lights on Voïvod a forthcoming book (2019) revisiting Blacky’s years with the band. The author, Monica Emond, collaborating with Thériault on the musical project Cœur Atomique, bases her critical bio-essay on at-length interviews and exclusive material.

Equipment

Bass guitars 
Liberatore guitar 1989, 5 strings E-A-D-G-B, dbl J-EMG :: self-custom design
Liberatore guitar 1987, 4 strings, dbl P-EMG :: self-custom design
Liberatore guitar 1986, 4 strings Kahler tremolo, dbl P-Dimarzio :: self-custom design
Fender Precision Bass 1972, 4 strings original (no mod)

Amps 
1986–1988
2 Marshall JCM 800 Head with FX mod by Rick Onslow 
2 EV Custom 4x15in speaker cabinets
1989–1991
1 Marshall Serie 9000 PreAmp
Crown MicroTech 1200 Head
2 EV Custom 4x15in speaker cabinets
2008 to present
2 Marshall Serie 9000 PreAmp
1 Acoustic 270 Head
1 Gallien-Krueger 800RB Head
2 Ampeg SVT-810E cabs

Effects/Pedals 
Yamaha SPX-90 II
Ibanez DM-1000 Digital Delay
BYW Audio Blacky's Blower, La Nocive, La Malefique

Discography 
Coeur Atomique:
Landscape of Emergency I 2017 (Coeur Atomique/Coup Sur Coup)
Online Free Release:
Castle Bravo 2015 (Coeur Atomique)
The Waste 2015 (Coeur Atomique)
Voivod albums:
War & Pain 1984 (Metal Blade Records)
Rrröööaaarrr 1986 (Noise Records)
Killing Technology 1987 (Noise Records)
Dimension Hatröss 1988 (Noise Records)
Nothingface 1989 (Mechanic / MCA Records)
Angel Rat 1991 (Mechanic / MCA Records)
Target Earth 2013 (Century Media Records)
Jean-Yves Thériault albums:
Poetry and Apocalypse 1994 (xVoto Recording)
Our Brief Eternity 1997 (xVoto Recording)
Twin Adventure / Renaissance Synthétique 2022 (Minemine Records)
Collaboration albums:
Spybey:Theriault 1997 (Ichor Recordings)
(Dis)integration 2008 (D-Group)

References

External links
 Coeur Atomique Website
 Minemine records Website
 Personal Website
 Voivod Fan Site

1962 births
Living people
Canadian heavy metal bass guitarists
Musicians from Saguenay, Quebec
Voivod (band) members
Coup Sur Coup Records artists